Eustroma is a genus of moths in the family Geometridae erected by Jacob Hübner in 1825.

Species
Species include:
 Eustroma aerosum (Butler, 1878)
 Eustroma aurantiarium (Moore, 1868)
 Eustroma aurigenum (Butler, 1880)
 Eustroma chalcopterum (Hampson, 1895)
 Eustroma changi (Inoue, 1986)
 Eustroma elistum (Prout, 1940)
 Eustroma hampsoni (Prout, 1958)
 Eustroma inextricatum (Walker, 1866)
 Eustroma japonicum (Inoue, 1986)
 Eustroma mardinatum (Staudinger, 1895)
 Eustroma melancholicum (Butler, 1878)
 Eustroma mixtilineatum (Hampson, 1895)
 Eustroma promachum (Prout, 1940)
 Eustroma reticulatum (Denis & Schiffermüller, 1775)

References

Cidariini